Teresa Glenc (born 27 May 1958) is a Polish politician. She was elected to the Sejm (9th term) representing the constituency of Bielsko-Biała II. She previously also served in the 8th term of the Sejm (2015–2019).

References

External links 
 

Living people
1958 births
Place of birth missing (living people)
21st-century Polish politicians
21st-century Polish women politicians
Members of the Polish Sejm 2015–2019
Members of the Polish Sejm 2019–2023
Women members of the Sejm of the Republic of Poland
People from Wodzisław County
Polish schoolteachers
Law and Justice politicians